The following is a list of top earning travel companies, which includes both travel agencies and corporate travel management companies, as published by Travel Weekly.

To qualify for the list, companies must have a minimum of $100 million in sales, with at least 15% of the sales volume having been generated in the United States.

References

Tourism companies
Lists of companies by industry
Lists of companies by revenue
Travel companies